GHN or ghn may refer to:

 G.hn, a networking standard
 GHN (news agency), a Georgian news agency
 Ghanongga language, ISO 639-3 ghn
 Global Heritage Network, for preservation of cultural sites
 Growth hormone 1
 Guanghan Airport, Sichuan, China, IATA code